Pyar Ka Taraana is a 1993 Bollywood drama movie. The movie starred Anita Ayoob, Mink Brar, Reema Lagoo and Akshay Anand. The movie was written and directed by famous actor Dev Anand.

Cast 
Akshay Anand as Kim
Anita Ayoob as Pinky
Manu Gargi as Gautam
Girija Shankar as Prem
Sushma Seth
Mink Brar as Chanda
Shreeram Lagoo
Reema Lagoo
Sulbha Arya
Rakesh Pandey
Brij Gopal

Soundtrack 
M. G. Hashmat wrote all songs.

References

External links
 

1993 films
1990s Hindi-language films
Films directed by Dev Anand
Films scored by Raamlaxman